Hafizabad (Urdu and ) is a city and capital of Hafizabad District located in Punjab, Pakistan. It is the 31st largest city of Pakistan. It is also a Tehsil.

Ancient history
Hafizabad is an old city in Punjab, Pakistan. In 327 BC, during Alexander's invasion of Punjab, the territory of the Sandal Bar was reported to be a well-populated area. Large cities were located in this territory, and a lot of sub-states were organised here under the presidency of maharajas and rajas.

In the 6th century, Hafizabad was visited by the famous Chinese traveller Xuanzang. He moved to Sangla and stayed one night in a town, then called Jaipura, which was located near the village of Koriala .

Medieval history
In the beginning of the 7th-century Rajput kingdoms dominated Eastern portions of Pakistan and northern India. In 997 CE, Sultan Mahmud Ghaznavi, took over the Ghaznavid dynasty empire established by his father, Sultan Sebuktegin, In 1005, he conquered the Shahis in Kabul, and followed it by the conquests of some western Punjab regions. Eastern Regions of Punjab from Multan to the Rawalpindi in the north (Including the region of present-day Hafizabad) remained under Rajput rule until 1193. The Delhi Sultanate and Mughal Empire later ruled the region. The Punjab region became predominately Muslim due to missionary Sufi saints whose dargahs dot the landscape of the Punjab region. During the Delhi Sultanate period, a big city was situated at the site of the present village of Mehdiabad. But afterwards, this territory became unpopulated and jungle because of a shortage of water and Afghan incursions. This situation persisted until Mughal Emperor Akbar's period. Hafizabad was formerly a place of some importance and is mentioned in the Ain-i-Akbari as the headquarters of a Mahal.

Independence
The predominantly Muslim population supported Muslim League and Pakistan Movement. After the independence of Pakistan in 1947, the minority Hindus and Sikhs migrated to India while Muslim refugees from India settled in Hafizabad. Most of the refugees have since settled and inter-married with the local population.

Connection with the city is by Gujranwala Road or Hafizabad Road. On the Wazirabad – Faisalabad Railway Section, Hafizabad is the eighth railway station. Basically, it is an agricultural city. Since the construction of an interchange near Sukheke Mandi, Hafizabad is now just 22 kilometres away from the M2 motorway.

Climate

The district climate is hot during summer and during winter is cold. The Eastern has proximity of rainfall than the western part. The monsoon season is from July to September. Fertile soil allows the cultivation of high-quality rice. The average per month rainfall is between 50 and 75 millimeters.

Rivers

The Chenab River originates in the snow-covered central range of the Himalayas. It receives numerous smaller streams from the lower hills which depend upon rainfall. It breaks out from a rocky gorge in the hills,  to the north of Bajwat District. Mostly people from Hafizabad take bath in that river.

Sialkot flows downward from Marala Headwork and enters Hafizabad District near Kot Kkamer, a village of Hafizabad Tehsil. It forms a natural boundary between Mandi Bahauddin and Hafizabad districts. Another very famous place is Head Sagar Complex in which an Irrigation Canal is passing over a link canal. It is a very common and interesting place for new visitors in Hafizabad.

Industry 
A major portion of the country's rice exports is from Hafizabad, which is sometimes referred to as the Land of Rice or City of Rice. Cotton power loom (weaving) is the second largest industry in Hafizabad. It is linked directly with the cotton market in Faisalabad and businessmen from Faisalabad deal directly with the cotton industry in Hafizabad. It plays an important role in the development of Hafizabad. This industry has been badly affected by the energy crisis.

Before the independence of Pakistan in 1947, the per-annum income of Hafizabad just from the rice was 15 million. Peshawar, Agra, Mithra, Calcutta, Karachi, and Sukker were Hafizabad's main clients. Up to 23 rice mills were there until the independence of Pakistan.

Agriculture 

The following types of rice are cultivated in Hafizabad: Basmati 385, Basmati 386, Super Karnal, 1121 Sella, Ery Nine, Erey Six, Super Fan, and KS 282. White Pearl Rice is a famous rice brand of Hafizabad. Hafizabad and Jalalpur Bhattian grain markets are considered to be the biggest grain rice export centres in the country.

Livestock 

Hafizabad richly diversified district in livestock population. According to the last Cattle Census, there are 57321 Buffaloes, 210033 Cattle, 25112 Sheep, 122215 Goats, 2885 Horses, 47197 Asses, 2806 Mules, 346 Camel and 456865 domestic poultry.

There are Two Artificial Insemination Centers one at Tehsil Hafizabad and the other at Tehsil Pindi Bhttian. There are six working Civil Veterinary Hospitals at Hafizabad, Pindi Bhattian, Jalalpur Bhattian, Sukheke Mandi, Vanike, Kaleke Soianwala. there are nine working Civil Veterinary Dispensaries at Wachke, Kot Sarwar, Dhunni, Madhrianwala, Chak Bhatti, Thatha Khairumatmal, Kot Nakka, Wadror and Ghubrika. Besides all this there are Civil Veterinary Centers at the village level.

There are two Mobile Veterinary Dispensaries at Hafizabad and Pindi Bhatian Tehsil respectively.

District Livestock Department is headed by District Office Livestock with two Deputy Livestock Officers viz Breed Improvement and Animal Health. There are Two Additional Principal Veterinary Officers, One Senior Veterinary Officer and eighteen Veterinary Officers.

Saints of District Hafizabad 
 Shah Sharmast Jilal U Din Bukhari: The tomb of Shah Sharmast is located in the north of Ghari Awan graveyard. The Mughal emperor Akbar and Jahangir visited him.
 Hafiz Syed Mustafa: He is a saint of Mughal era and each year on the 24th of Har month the religious festival organised by the natives.
 Shah Abdullah Ghaus: He was one of the most famous Sufi of Hafizabad. His shrine is in Garhi Awan the oldest settlement of the city.
 Shah Buban Bukhari: He is known as Baban Bukhari. There is one mosque within premises of his tomb named as Chah Bukhari.
  Rehmat Khan Awan: He was the most renowned member of the Awan dynasty. He was instructed by Sultan Bahoo and from Noon Sufi saint.
 Jalal Badshah: He was one of the most famous Sufi of Hafizabad. The mazar of jalal badsha is located in madharianwala Village 4 km away from Hafizabad at sukheki road. 
 Marwan Shah: He was born in 11th Hijri in the village of Jogi Jamkay. After the demise of his father during early childhood, he opted for the profession of labouring. It is famous and known that during Shab e barat when he was watering the fields of his master the water became milk.
 Syed Niamat Ali Shah: Noor Shah Sadar-u- Din was his father and Wali Qutab Imam of Begum Kot Lahore was his brother. He came to Jalalpur for preaching Islam. He lived in the district and died at the age of 90. He is buried in Jalalpur and every year his urs is arranged on 15 'Har'(A month of 'Bikrami' year)
 Makhdoom Pir Syed Naubahaar Shah Bukhari: He was born in 1876 and died in 1978. He is the descendant of Syed Jalaluddin Surkh Posh Bukhari, Uch Sharif and his grandson Sajjada Nasheen Darbar-e-Jalalia, Makhdoom Jalaluddin also known as Makhdoom Jahanian Jahan Gasht. His mausoleum is located at the border of district Hafizabad, 18 km on M3 from Pindi Bhattian to Faisalabad. His Urs is arranged on 26 & 27 'Jaith'(A month of 'Bikrami' year)
 Sain Sharif: Also known as Nanga Peer rests in the east of Garhi Awan graveyard. He departed from this world in near past and still remains a source of great attraction to his followers and believers of Sufism in Hafizabad.
 Sheikh Mosa Dud: He was a contemporary and devotees of Baba Fareed Gunj Shaker. It is stated that when once Baba Fareed Gunjh Shaker was going for pilgrimage, he asked Sheikh Mosa Dud to come along with him but he apologised. When Baba Fareed reached 'Macca' he saw that Mosa Dud was already there. That's' why the devotees of Fareed Shaker Gunj called him Mosa Dud. He is buried in Mehmood Pur, a slum of Jalalpur.
 Sai Abdullah Qadri: Kassoki Road, Hafizabad(Near Masjid Sobedaar wali)
 Hakeem Muhammad Siddique : A famously well known Tabeeb in all over the Punjab. He was born in 1905 and died in 1984. Dr Saeed Ahmad and Zahoor Ahmad Siddiqui the sons of Hakeem Muhammad Siddique.
Dr. Saeed Ahmad .Saleemi Homoeopathic Clinic: He is well known homoeopath. Humayun Saeed Additional District&Sessions Judge is his Son While Muhammad Daud Saleemi Assistant Commissioner is his grandson.
 Hakeem Zahoor Ahmad Siddiqui: He is also famously known all over the Punjab as Tabeeb e Haziq. He was born in 1947 and died on 19 July 2005. Babur Ijaz Siddiqui, Hakeem Muhammad Saber Siddiqui and Muhammad Jawad Siddiqui are the son of Hakeem Zahoor Ahmad Siddiqui
 Baba Peer Khuram – Banjar: A well-known shrine at Banjar near Lahore- Islamabad Motorway in district Hafizabad. Current Successor is Syed Nasir Ali Shah, a famous youngest syed zada.
' Baba Umber Shah Bukhari: He was one of the most famous peer. His shrine is in Assdullah Pur near vanike Tarar District Hafizabad the oldest settlement of the village. There was many stories of Baba Umber Shah Bukhari Salam Baba G'edited by Saith Awais Maa Thari was a woman saint whose shrine located there in village Chak Chatta, Tehsil Hafizabad. every year Urs is been held by her devotees and number of people came there get amused by different cultural games and other entertainments.
 Pir Qasim Ali shah was also one of the famous saint whose shrine located there in village peer kot sani, just 1.5 km away from chakchattah in Hafizabad, every year (after the cultivation of wheat crop). Urs is held by his devotees and a number of people came there get amused by different cultural games and other entertainments.
 Syed Shabbir Hussain Shah Naqvi' was a religious scholar, Saint and a political magnate. He was the leader of Ahle Sunnat Jammat here. His siblings are also working for the preaching of true face of Islam. His tomb lies in a mosque named as AL Farooq Mosque at Vanike Road.

References 

Tehsils of Punjab, Pakistan
Hafizabad District
Populated places in Hafizabad District
Cities in Punjab (Pakistan)